Bankra is a census town in Domjur CD Block of Howrah Sadar subdivision in Howrah district in the Indian state of West Bengal. It is a part of Kolkata Urban Agglomeration.

Geography
It has an average elevation of 8 metres (26 feet).

Demographics
As per 2011 Census of India Bankra had a total population of 63,957 of which 33,079 (52%) were males and 30,878 (48%) were females. Population below 6 years was 8,911. The total number of literates in Bankra was 41,560 (75.50% of the population over 6 years).

Bankra was part of Kolkata Urban Agglomeration in 2011 census.

 India census, Bankra had a population of 48,403. Males constitute 52% of the population and females 48%.  15% of the population is under 6 years of age.

Transport
Makardaha Road is the artery of the town.

Bus

Private Bus
 63 Domjur - Howrah Station
 E43 Dihibhursut - Howrah Station
 E44 Rampur - Howrah Station
 E53 Narit - Howrah Station
 L3 Jhikhira/Muchighata - Howrah Station

Mini Bus
 16 Domjur - Howrah Station
 27 Bankra - Park Circus
 31 Makardaha - Khidirpur
 34 Purash - Howrah Station
 35 Hantal - Howrah Station

CTC Bus
 C11/1 Munsirhat - Howrah Station

Bus Routes Without Numbers
 Pancharul - Howrah Station
 Udaynarayanpur - Howrah Station
 Rajbalhat - Howrah Station
 Tarakeswar - Howrah Station

Train
Dasnagar railway station , Dansi railway station and Bankra nayabaz railway station are the nearest railway stations.

References

Cities and towns in Howrah district
Neighbourhoods in Kolkata
Kolkata Metropolitan Area